Rosa laevigata, the Cherokee rose, is a white, fragrant rose native to southern China and Taiwan south to Laos and Vietnam, and invasive in the United States.

Description
The flowers are  diameter, fragrant, with pure white petals and yellow stamens, and are followed by bright red and bristly hips  diameter. The flower stem is also very bristly.

Cultivation
The species was introduced to the southeastern United States in about 1780, where it soon became naturalized, and where it gained its English name.

Cultural references
The flower is commonly associated with the Trail of Tears, the forced relocation of Native Americans in the southeastern United States. Its white petals are said to represent the tears the Cherokee women shed during the period of great hardship and grief throughout US government-forced march from the Cherokees' home to U.S. forts, such as Gilmer. The flower's gold center is said to symbolize the gold taken from the Cherokee tribe.

It is the state flower of Georgia.

In popular culture
The flower is referenced in The Walking Dead episode of the same name by Daryl Dixon in an attempt to comfort Carol Peletier, who at this time had lost her daughter.

References

Flora of China: Rosa laevigata

laevigata
Vines
American folklore
History of the Cherokee
Flora of Asia
Symbols of Georgia (U.S. state)